Petenes was one of the Persian generals in the Battle of the Granicus in 334 BC in Asia Minor (modern-day Turkey). He was killed during the cavalry engagement.

References

Sources

External links
Original text of The Anabasis of Alexander
English version of The Anabasis of Alexander 

Military leaders of the Achaemenid Empire
Military personnel of the Achaemenid Empire killed in action
4th-century BC Iranian people